King Star King is an American adult animated web series created by J.J. Villard for Adult Swim; Eric Kaplan also worked on the series' pilot episode. The series aired on the network's online video streaming service Adult Swim Video on June 15, 2014 before it was aired on TV.

A TV special King Star King!/!/!/ aired on February 13, 2023, and it revealed his real name being "Greg McNelson". The special also takes place on Christmas.

Synopsis
The series revolves around the titular character, King Star King (Tommy Blacha): a tall, blond muscular man. After seducing his love, Princess Snow White, he falls from his higher plane of existence to serve as a fry cook in a run-down waffle house. In order to reclaim his place in the heavens, he must battle his amnesia to defeat the evil Spring Bunny (Eric Kaplan) and rescue Snow White.

Production
The pilot was announced preceding the network's 2012 upfront as part of their development slate. It was also disclosed during the upfront, and was reported again before the network's upfront the following year. It was announced as a web series for Adult Swim Video to premiere June 15, 2014; the series was advertised as "too shexxxy " for television. The network conducted an online poll whether episodes should be released daily or all at once; on June 11, the network announced it would release all six episodes of the first season simultaneously. A sweepstake for the series was announced on June 9, promoting six chances to win original artwork by Villard.

The series is animated using Adobe Flash by Titmouse, Inc. with ink and paint services made by Cyber Chicken Studios in South Korea and produced by J.J. Villard's vanity card, Kurtis; Mirari Films's Romanian facilities provided animation for the pilot episode. In an interview at the 2013 Comic-Con, Villard dubbed the titular character as "He-Man on drugs". Series developer Tommy Blacha went on to describe comments with the network's Standards and Practices to "better tell [the show]." When asked about the inspiration for the series, Blacha joked that Villard pitched the series to network executive Mike Lazzo with a drawing of the protagonist, to which he approved production of the pilot. The two explained that as Villard started working on it with another producer and driving Lazzo "crazy," he abandoned the pilot; this led to Blacha joining as producer and toning it down by "two percent."

Voices
 Tommy Blacha - King Star King, Hank Waffles (2014), Gurbles, Fat Frank, Mike Balls, KWA KWA
 Robin Atkin Downes - Narrator, Alfonso Molestro, Doctor, Chunkles, Hank's Mother, Tim Tumor, Carmine Excrementi, Pinchy Laroux, God Star God
 J.J. Villard - Pooza, Customer, Surfer
 Rachel Butera - Princess Snow White (2014), Slutty Waitress, Baroness Sludgeclot, Smear, Mrs. Balls, Burger Bitch
 Mallory McGill - Princess Snow White (2013)
 Eric Kaplan - Spring Bunny, Scrod
 Will Sasso - Eddie 5 Antlers
 Justin Roiland - Hank Waffles (2023), Cop

Episodes

Pilot (2013)

Series (2014)

Special (2023)

Release and reception
The pilot was screened at the 2013 San Diego Comic-Con International, along with a panel hosted by Villard and Blacha. In July 2013, it was released online as part of a presentation of in-development shows for the network, partnered with KFC; viewers could vote for their favorite pilot, with the winner being broadcast on August 26, 2013. The series lost to Übermansion, a Stoopid Buddy Stoodios production, although the presentation won an Internet Advertising Campaign Award in 2014 for "Best TV Integrated Ad Campaign". Nevertheless, the pilot aired on the network's Toonami block on November 3, 2013 during the daylight saving time transition; Nielsen ratings were not captured during this period.

Meredith Woerner of io9 said that the series gained their approval at its description of a "punk rock He-Man". Conversely, upon surveying the show's description, Patrick Kevin Day of the Los Angeles Times official blog dubbed the network a "home for stupid characters".

References

External links
 
 
 King Star King pilot on Adult Swim Video

2014 web series debuts
2014 web series endings
2010s American adult animated television series
2010s American comic science fiction television series
American adult animated adventure television series
American adult animated comedy television series
American adult animated science fiction television series
American adult animated fantasy television series
American animated science fantasy television series
American adult animated web series
American comedy web series
Fantasy web series
American science fiction web series
English-language television shows
Adult Swim original programming
Television shows about drugs
Television series by Williams Street